Harford Transit, commonly known as Harford Transit LINK, Transit LINK, or simply LINK, is a public transportation service of the Harford County, Maryland Department of Transportation. It provides eight city fixed route services in this suburban Baltimore county. The Maryland Transit Administration complements these routes, providing bus access to Baltimore with its commuter lines, or access to Baltimore or Washington via rail.

Routes
Harford Transit LINK operates seven routes Mondays through Fridays, closing on federal holidays and some adjacent days for holiday observances. Lines have various starting and stopping times, but none run overnight. The earliest route begins at 5:07 a.m. with the latest route closing at 8:57 p.m.

Route 1 – Green Line: Havre de Grace–Aberdeen–Bel Air
Route 2 – Blue Line: Bel Air–Abingdon–Edgewood
Route 3 – Silver Line: Aberdeen–Edgewood–Joppatowne
Route 4 – Yellow Line: Aberdeen Circulator
Route 5 – Teal Line: Aberdeen–Perryville–Havre de Grace–Perryman
Route 6 – Orange Line: Bel Air Circulator
Route 7 – Red Line: Aberdeen–Riverside–Edgewood

References

Bus transportation in Maryland
Transportation in Harford County, Maryland